Kovačevac is a settlement situated in Mladenovac municipality in Serbia.

References

Populated places in Serbia